Lost Patrol, also known as The Lost Patrol, is a survival action role-playing game with strategy elements developed by the team Shadow Development and published by Ocean Software for the Amiga and Atari ST computers in 1990. An MS-DOS port by Astros Productions was published in 1991.

Gameplay

The game is set during the Vietnam War in 1966, when a U.S. helicopter returning troops from a R&R break in Saigon crashes in a remote area of the Central Highlands. Seven American survivors of the crash have no radio and face the task of trekking across 58 miles of harsh terrain infested with booby traps and enemies and make their way to the nearest U.S. military outpost at Du Hoc.

The player assumes the role of Sergeant Charlie Weaver, who takes charge of the survivors (one or more of whom can be randomly injured from the crash). The player must learn the characteristics of the team, as completing the mission may hinge upon character reactions to the player's decisions, and then try to keep the group's morale high (or risk desertions or even being fragged) and fatigue low, managing the dwindling resources (food rations, ammunition, hand grenades and Claymore mines) and fending off the enemy. The game also features several types of action sequences:

Hand-to-Hand - Designated scouts at times encounter lone VC guerrilla guarding an arms or supply bunker. The player must defeat the opponent in unarmed combat, using a choice of keyboard or joystick controls. If the player fails to defeat the opponent before a timer expires, that soldier is assumed missing in action and is no longer available.
Battle Sequence - The player mans an M60 machine gun against a group of the VC assaulting his position in a ruined farmhouse, trying to be neither killed nor overrun. Hand grenades may be also used against the enemy.
Grenade Section - The squad encounters one or more entrenched machine gun nests of the NVA in a rice field. The player must eliminate them by hurling hand grenades from the first-person perspective.
Sniper Section - The squad is pinned down by enemy sniper fire from a cluster of huts, requiring the sniper(s) to be located and disposed of. The player can choose which member of the team will assume the role of the shooter, with skill levels varying. To locate the position of the sniper(s), a magnified view of the terrain is visible through the scope of the player's rifle, which he must use to locate the flashes of enemy fire.
Minefield - The squad must cross mine fields laid by enemy forces to defend an entry to a bunker. Mine fields are visible on the map, but the booby traps are not (the only solution is to move slowly in an areas that may be mined). To successfully navigate the mine field, the player must choose a member of the squad to crawl through the minefield, stabbing at the ground along the way to check for explosives, before time limit runs out.

The player may always try to retreat from each encounter, but this is risky, too. The group may also encounter local Vietnamese and Montagnard (in the mountains) civilians, including while entering villages visible on the map. A range of options is then available, from searching area to killing one or even all of civilians. The player may also attempt to communicate with the locals (in a friendly talk or a hard interrogation) using the key words typed from keyboard (for example, typing "VC" to ask for enemy forces).

Some of the soldiers have special traits. Richard Bachman is a highly proficient marksman and thus useful for the sniping sections of the game. William Blom is useful in the hand to hand sections due to his background as a martial artist. Juan Gomez is invaluable in the game as he is more likely to detect booby traps in the map if made a pointman, and is also the only one capable of checking an enemy tunnel if one is discovered.

Development

Lost Patrol began as an idea to make a game in the style of Cinemaware's 'interactive movie' titles but with more gameplay, and the designer and artist Ian Harling even sent a game concept to Cinemaware and six other companies but was rejected, until Ocean Software's Gary Bracey accepted it in early 1989 when they decided to move on to the 16-bit market. Lost Patrol was originally intended by Ocean as a follow-up to their 1987's Platoon and was thus initially subtitled Platoon II.

Upon reading more about the atrocities of the Vietnam War, Harling decided to incorporate moral dilemmas into the plot. Several segments were changed or abandoned altogether due to technical limitations and other reasons, such as the tunnel sequence which was cut altogether. Harling created the graphics using Deluxe Paint II, scanned hand-drawn images with photographic references, and digitized Vietnam footage stills for the Amiga as the prime platforms. His original 32-color graphics were then downgraded for the Atari ST.

The game was programmed by Simon Cooke, with whom Harling had previously worked on an unreleased game, Xenodrome. Nick Byron aided them with ideas and additional coding and also created the hand-to-hand sequence. There was a widely pirated, leaked Amiga version of the game that was incomplete, buggy and prone to crash. Lost Patrol was also later ported to MS-DOS by Astros Productions. The main theme playing throughout the game was composed by Chris Glaister.

Reception

Lost Patrol sold very well and was in the UK's Amiga's top ten chart in late 1990. The game received mostly positive reviews upon its release, including the scores of 85% from The Games Machine, 73% from The One, 79% from Amiga Format, and 83% from CU Amiga. Zero gave the Amiga version of Lost Patrol an overall score of 89%, while the ST version got 88%.

Computer Gaming World's 1992 & 1994 surveys of wargames with modern settings gave the game zero stars out of five, criticizing the joystick controls as "so poorly done that the entire game is totally unplayable."

According to Roberto Dillon's 2011 book The Golden Age of Video Games, it was "a unique game among military and combat simulations" that "offered a different perspective on war from any other game released before or since ... showing there is no glory in war but only pain and destruction."

References

External links
Lost Patrol at Amiga Hall of List
Lost Patrol at Lemon Amiga
Lost Patrol at Atari Mania

1990 video games
Action role-playing video games
Amiga games
Anti-war video games
Atari ST games
DOS games
Ocean Software games
Single-player video games
Survival video games
Vietnam War video games
Video games set in Vietnam
Video games set in the 1960s
Video games developed in the United Kingdom